Havildar Bahadur Singh Bohra, AC was a Non Commissioned Officer (NCO) the 10th Battalion, Parachute Regiment of the Indian Army who was a posthumous recipient of Ashok Chakra, India's highest peacetime gallantry award.

Ashok Chakra Citation

The Ashok Chakra citation for Bahadur Singh Bohra reads -

Havildar Bahadur Singh Bohra (10th Battalion The Parachute Regiment (Special Forces) - posthumous): Havildar Bahadur Singh Bohra was the squad commander of an assault team deployed for a search operation in general area Lawanz of Jammu and Kashmir.

On 25th September 2008, at 6.15 pm, he observed a group of terrorists and moved quickly to intercept them. In the process, he came under heavy hostile fire. Undaunted, he charged at the terrorists and killed one of them. However, he suffered severe gun shot wounds. Refusing evacuation, he continued with the assault and killed two more terrorists at extremely close range.

Havildar Bahadur Singh Bohra, thus, displayed most conspicuous bravery and made the supreme sacrifice for the nation in fighting the terrorists.

Personal life
He was born in a remote village Rawalkhet, in the Pithoragarh district of Uttarakhand and was the youngest among 4 children, with 2 elder sisters and an elder brother. He is survived by his wife Shanti and 2 daughters, Mansi and Sakshi.

References

Indian Army personnel
2008 deaths
Year of birth missing
Recipients of the Ashoka Chakra (military decoration)
Ashoka Chakra